The Growth X is commonly used to describe the pattern created when plotting the market value of a successful growth company against its relative valuation over time.  Early on in a company's life cycle (particularly with internet investments), companies can demand high valuations despite little or negative earnings.  When the company breaks even, its valuation seems inflated from a relative valuation standpoint (market value divided by the company's earnings, EBITDA, or cash flow).  Over time as the earnings power grows, the relative valuation begins to fall as earnings often growth faster than the market value (stock price).

This pattern can be observed in most successful companies in recent history (AAPL, GOOG, FB).  The Growth X is commonly used among growth and venture capital investors, and is believed to be coined by Spencer Walsh and Vidur Singhal, two prominent Silicon Valley internet investors.

Much like other technical indicators, The Growth X is often disputed and depends on a company's ability to continually grow earnings.  If investors bid up the market value of the company faster than the earnings growth rate, then The Growth X will not form, and the relative valuation will stay flat or continue to rise.  Eventually relative valuations fall as growth prospects diminish, but this can often occur quickly and cause a step function down in valuation multiples.

References

Valuation (finance)